is a Japanese comedy manga series written and illustrated by Yasuhisa Kubo. It was serialized in Kodansha's seinen manga magazine Evening from October 2007 to December 2018, with its chapters collected in sixteen tankōbon volumes.

Four original animation DVDs (OADs) were released between 2010 and 2014. A 13-episode anime adaptation by Production I.G aired in Japan between April and July 2011. A second season, titled You're Being Summoned, Azazel Z, aired from April to June 2013. In North America, the series is licensed by Nozomi Entertainment, who released both seasons on DVD in February 2015. Funimation began streaming the series on their website in partnership with Nozomi Entertainment in May 2021.

Characters

A dog-like demon. He is a pervert who gets never-ending enjoyment in sexually harassing others, especially Sakuma. He is also deathly afraid of Akutabe, who tends to abuse him when he gets out of line or fails to accomplish a goal. His ability is called Lewdness, which gives him the ability to incite lust. His powers range from making people attractive, unattractive, and even cause impotence. When Akutabe ended their contract, he became contracted with Sakuma much to her chagrin. 
He represents 'Lust' of the seven deadly sins.

Rinko Sakuma is the young female assistant of Akutabe. Young and naive, she is just starting to learn about the power of demons. She is bound in a contract with Azazel. She appears to be one of the more moral people in the series early on, but as she learns more about demons, she becomes considerably darker. Many of the demons note she is becoming more like Akutabe. She is also easily influenced by money.

Akutabe is a detective that specializes in using demons. He is very knowledgeable in the occult, and uses this knowledge to overpower the demons, even enabling him to block a powered up Divulgence spell from Beelzebub. He is Sakuma's employer as well as a mentor. He will summon demons to do his bidding and will often mistreat them if they annoy him or mess up their assignments. His reputation for cruelty has caused even demons to fear him.

A childhood friend of Azazel who is a part of an elite family of demons. Despite appearing to be a bird, he is actually a fly demon who eats feces much to the disgust of those around him. He also has an ability called Divulgence which gives him the power to make others reveal their hidden selves ranging from revealing the side of them they don't want people to see, to forced defecation. He can also use goat dung as a doping drug, making his attacks considerably more powerful.
He represents 'Gluttony' of the seven deadly sins.

Salamander is a red lizard like demon who was originally summoned by an amateur for personal, selfish reasons. Because the summoner was uneducated, Salamander dominated his spirit. Salamander has an ability called Revolution which makes people believe their own words when they say things they don't truly believe. He always carries a Katana that is strapped to his waist.
He represents 'Greed' of the seven deadly sins.

Undine is a mermaid demon, with the ability to take on human form. She has fallen in love with Akutabe much to his chagrin. Her ability is Jealousy, which makes it so that whenever she is jealous of another woman for whatever reason, she is able to transform that woman with her will. When she is happy, these curses are undone.
She represents 'Envy' of the seven deadly sins.

A bull like demon under Akutabe's control. According to Azazel and Beelzebub, he is the most violent demon in Hell and both are evidently scared of him, especially when he is angered. Akutabe praises him as a demon on a higher league than his other demons and explained that he has the ability called Violence though what it does is unknown. He was apparently killed when Sariel took his grimoire to heaven.
He represents 'Wrath' of the seven deadly sins.
Mossan II is the younger brother of Moloch and has a worse temper than Moloch.

A boy who is the grandson of an acquaintance of Akutabe. His overall personality is parallel to Azazel, albeit angrier and verbally abusive. Examples of this includes sexually harassing Sakuma on their first meeting and picks a fight with Azazel. He is contracted with Gusion.

A winged monkey like demon who was one of Solomon's 72 demons. He is contracted with Kōtarō whom the later sacrificed the memories of his grandfather to form a contract with him. His special ability is called Forgetfulness. This ability allows him to eat the memories of others, especially fond memories.
He represents 'Sloth' of the seven deadly sins.

An angel sent to collect grimoires of demons. Due to a strict law imposed on angels, he cannot help mortals in need despite his righteous nature and can only act as an observer. Also of note is that they cannot help even themselves if a human is the one tormenting them. The only time angels are permitted to help humans is if a demon is involved, in which case they will take its grimoire back to heaven. He steals Moloch's grimoire and takes it to heaven, killing the latter in the process.

Another angel sent to collect grimoires. Like Sariel, he is a hypocrite as an angel, spending years climbing mountains and watching porn, waiting till the last minute to do his duties. He tried to steal Beelzebub's grimoire, but failed and became a fallen angel.

A pink dog-like demon similar in style to Azazel, she is an occasional lover of his that believes that the two of them are married due to their physical relationship.

Media

Manga
Yondemasuyo, Azazel-san is written and illustrated by Yasuhisa Kubo. The manga was serialized in Kodansha's seinen manga magazine Evening from October 5, 2007, to December 11, 2018. Kodansha collected its chapters in sixteen tankōbon volumes, released from April 23, 2008, to February 22, 2019.

Volume list

Original animation DVD
An original animation DVD (OAD) was bundled with the limited edition of the manga's 4th volume on February 23, 2010 and another episode with the limited edition of the 5th volume on September 22, 2010. A third OAD was bundled with the limited edition of the manga's 8th volume on May 23, 2012. A fourth OAD was bundled with the limited edition of the manga's 11th volume on June 23, 2014.

Anime
A 13-episode anime television series adaptation by Production I.G. was broadcast on Tokyo MX and other networks from April 8 to July 1, 2011. The opening song is "Pandemic!!" by Chihiro Yonekura, and the ending song is "Like a Party" by Team Nekokan ft. Chihiro Yonekura.

A second 13-episode season, titled , was broadcast from April 7 to June 30, 2013. Chihiro Yonekura.

In North America, Nozomi Entertainment released both series' seasons on DVD on February 3, 2015. Funimation began streaming the series on their website in partnership with Nozomi Entertainment on May 1, 2021.

You're Being Summoned, Azazel

You're Being Summoned, Azazel Z

References

External links
  
  
  
 

2007 manga
2010 anime OVAs
2011 anime television series debuts
2013 anime television series debuts
Anime series based on manga
Dark comedy anime and manga
Kodansha manga
Production I.G
Seinen manga
Seven deadly sins in popular culture
Supernatural anime and manga